The Fry Esprit VFII is a Swiss amateur-built aircraft, designed by Valentino Fry and produced by Fry Aircraft Design of Wilen bei Wollerau. The aircraft is supplied as plans for amateur construction.

Design and development
The Esprit VFII features a cantilever low-wing, a single-seat enclosed cockpit under a bubble canopy, fixed conventional landing gear with wheel pants and a single engine in tractor configuration.

The aircraft is of carbon fibre composite construction. The recommended engines are the  Walter Minor and the turbocharged  Lom Praha four-stroke powerplants.

Specifications (Esprit VFII)

References

External links

Homebuilt aircraft
Single-engined tractor aircraft